Terminism is the Christian doctrine that there is a time limit for repentance from sin, after which God no longer wills the conversion and salvation of that person.  This limit is asserted to be known to God alone, making conversion urgent.  Among pietists such as Quakers, the doctrine permitted the co-existence, over the span of a human life, of human free will and God's sovereignty.

Terminism in salvation  
Terminism in salvation is also mentioned in Max Weber's famous sociological work The Protestant Ethic and the Spirit of Capitalism. "[Terminism] assumes that grace is offered to all men, but for everyone either once at a  definite moment in his life or at some moment for the last time" (Part II, Ch. 4, Section B). Weber offers in the same paragraph that terminism is "generally (though unjustly) attributed to Pietism by its opponents".

Philosophical terminism  
Terminism is defined by rhetorician Walter J. Ong, who links it to nominalism, as "a concomitant of the highly quantified formal logic  of medieval scholastic philosophy, and thus contrasts with theology which had closer connections with metaphysics and special commitments to rhetoric" (135).

See also  
 Bartholomaeus Arnoldi von Usingen  
 Nicholas of Autrecourt  
 Gabriel Biel  
 Jean Buridan  
 John Cantius  
 Pierre Ceffons   
 Johann Eck  
 Robert Holcot  
 John Mair
 John of Mirecourt  
 William of Ockham  
 Henry of Oyta  
 Durandus of Saint-Pourçain  
 Adam de Wodeham

References

Further reading  
 John Pascal Mazzola (1939), The Writings of John Wessel Gansfort (1419-1489):  Considered as a Critique of the Theological and Ecclesiological Problems of the Fifteenth Century, PhD dissertation, University of Pittsburgh.  
 Heiko Oberman (2001), The Harvest of Medieval Theology:  Gabriel Biel and Late Medieval Nominalism, revised edition, Grand Rapids, MI:  Baker.  

 
Christian soteriology